Antonio Martínez del Castillo known professionally as Florián Rey was a Spanish director, actor, and screenwriter. He directed The Cursed Village, widely recognized as a seminal work in silent Spanish cinema, and helped launch the career of famed Argentinian–Spanish actress Imperio Argentina.

Early career
While in his teens, Rey began work as a journalist for multiple newspapers in his home province of Zaragoza and nearby Madrid. It was during this time that he assumed the name Florián Rey. He took work as an actor, first in the theater in Madrid and then film. His first film role was in La inaccessible in 1920.

Rey's directorial debut was with the film The Troublemaker in 1924.
As with many of his early films, The Troublemaker was an adaptation of a zarzuela, a Spanish musical theater that was highly popular with the middle and lower classes of the late nineteenth century.

In 1926, Rey, with Spanish director Juan de Orduña, created the production company Goya Films. Rey continued directing zarzuela adaptations and other forms of melodramas through the 1920s for Goya Films as well as other production companies.

In 1927, Rey cast Argentinian–Spanish actress Imperio Argentina in Sister San Sulpicio. This marked her debut as an actress in Spain.
The two would later collaborate on other films and eventually marry.

Rey directed The Cursed Village in 1929. This would be his most successful film and is regarded by many critics as a masterpiece of silent Spanish cinema. This necessitated additional shooting and synchronization in Paris. The decision to move sound production to France stemmed from Rey's dissatisfaction with the quality of the sound in his first talkie, Football, Love, and Bullfighting, in 1929.
No copy of the sound version of  exists today.

Rey incorporated such aspects of Russian Expressionism into his film as attention to shadow, camera "walk-throughs" (actors walk towards a camera followed by a shot of them moving away, as if they moved through it), and closeups on peasant faces.

Later work
While touring Mexico to promote and show , Rey and his wife Imperio Argentina were courted by German officials intending to hire him to direct movies for Hispano-Film Produktion.
Upon their visit to Germany, Rey and Argentina were met by both Adolf Hitler and Joseph Goebbels to discuss film projects. Goebbels requested that Rey remake one of his earlier films based on a rewritten script that would be provided to him. Instead, Rey decided on an adaptation of Carmen. The resulting film, starred Argentina as the titular Carmen.

Rey remained in Germany and made additional films for Hispano-Film Produktion. Amidst rumors that Argentina had an affair with Hitler, the couple divorced and Rey returned to Spain.
Rey and Argentina's relationship in Germany was the inspiration for the film The Girl of Your Dreams, directed by Fernando Trueba in 1998.

Upon his return to Spain, Rey continued working for CIFESA studios.

Filmography

Notes

References

Bibliography
Sánchez Vidal, Agustín. El cine de Florián Rey, Zaragoza, Caja de Ahorros de la Inmaculada de Aragón, 1991;

External links
 Florián Rey profilea , enciclopedia-aragonesa.com; accessed 30 October 2016.
  Antón Castro. Recuerdo de Florián Rey, antoncastro.blogia.com; accessed 30 October 2016.

1894 births
1962 deaths
People from Valdejalón
Spanish film directors
Spanish male film actors
Spanish male silent film actors
Film directors from Aragon